Polianthion is a genus of plants in the Rhamnaceae family, first described by Kevin R. Thiele in 2006.<ref name=apni>{{APNI2|id=195049|name=Polianthion}}</ref> The genus name derives from the Greek  polios (grey) and anthion (little flower), and describes the small, densely grey-pubescent flowers.

Species
(From GBIF)Polianthion bilocularis  (WA)Polianthion collinum  (WA)Polianthion minutiflorum  (QLD)Polianthion wichurae''  (WA)

References

Rhamnaceae genera
Taxa named by Kevin Thiele
Taxa described in 2006